Diadenosine hexaphosphate hydrolase (AMP-forming) (hAps1, NUDT11 (gene), hAps2, NUDT10 (gene)) is an enzyme with systematic name P1,P6-bis(5'-adenosyl)hexaphosphate nucleotidohydrolase (AMP-forming). This enzyme catalyses the following chemical reaction

 (1) P1,P6-bis(5'-adenosyl)hexaphosphate + H2O  adenosine 5'-pentaphosphate + AMP
 (2) P1,P5-bis(5'-adenosyl)pentaphosphate + H2O  adenosine 5'-tetraphosphate + AMP

A divalent cation is essential for activity.

References

External links 
 

EC 3.6.1